Stevenson Airport  is a city-owned public-use airport located two nautical miles (3.7 km) southwest of the central business district of Stevenson, a city in Jackson County, Alabama, United States.

Facilities and aircraft 
It has one runway designated 5/23 with an asphalt surface measuring 4,103 by 80 feet (1,251 x 24 m).

For the 12-month period ending May 20, 2009, the airport had 6,440 aircraft operations, an average of 17 per day: 98% general aviation and 2% military. At that time there were 7 aircraft based at this airport: 100% single-engine.

References

External links 
 Aerial image as of 6 April 1998 from USGS The National Map
 Airfield photos for 7A6 from Civil Air Patrol

Airports in Alabama
Transportation buildings and structures in Jackson County, Alabama